The 1959–60 season was the 76th football season in which Dumbarton competed at a Scottish national level, entering the Scottish Football League, the Scottish Cup and the Scottish League Cup.  In addition Dumbarton competed in the Stirlingshire Cup.

Scottish Second Division

A perfect start of 4 wins from the first four games was followed by a run of 13 games with only a single win, meaning that Dumbarton fell away and were never serious challengers for the Division 2 title, finishing in 6th place with 43 points, 10 behind champions St Johnstone.

Scottish League Cup

With only a single win and a draw from their 6 qualifying games, Dumbarton again failed to progress to the knock out stages of the League Cup.

Scottish Cup

Dumbarton were to fall at the first hurdle in the national cup, losing to Queen of the South.

Stirlingshire Cup
In the county cup, Dumbarton lost out to Falkirk in the semi final, after a drawn game.

Friendlies
A number of friendlies were played during the season, including home and away fixtures against English Midland League opponents, North Shields, and a benefit match against Clyde for long serving player, Hughie Gallacher.

Player statistics

Squad 

|}

Source:

International Caps
Willie McCulloch earned his first and second caps playing for Scotland Amateurs against England on 26 March and Northern Ireland on 25 April respectively.

Transfers
Amongst those players joining and leaving the club were the following:

Players in

Players out 

Source:

Reserve team
Dumbarton played only one competitive 'reserve' match in the Scottish Second XI Cup, losing to Clyde in the second round.

References

Dumbarton F.C. seasons
Scottish football clubs 1959–60 season